Stingray Music (formerly Music Choice) is a multilingual digital music pay radio service based in Germany, the Netherlands and the United Kingdom, owned by the Stingray Group, and is currently available in 17 countries across Europe and the Middle East. Stingray Music consists of several multilingual commercial-free audio-only linear radio channels devoted to a particular genre or related-grouping of music. Stingray Music also operates an ad-supported video-on-demand service that offers music videos and also broadcasts live on the Internet and mobile app.

History 
The service launched as Music Choice in 1993 by shareholders including Sony and Time Warner. In 2007 Music Choice acquired its main competitor, Xtra Music (DMX).

By the end of June 2010 Sky TV removed Music Choice from its subscriptions after 15 years of service. It had also been available for a while in the late 1990s on some UK analogue cable services.
 
Canadian company Stingray Group purchased Music Choice in 2011.

After three years Music Choice returned in the United Kingdom, and launched on the TalkTalk platform via an application, or 'Player', on YouView by the end of April 2013.

On 1 April 2015, Stingray renamed Music Choice into Stingray Music.

On 1 April 2019, Stingray Music closed on Ziggo in the Netherlands. It has been replaced by Xite Music.

Linear channels

Decades
60s
70s
80s
90s
00s
Revival 60s-70s
Rewind 80s-90s
Rock N' Roll

Pop
All Day Party
Drive
Freedom
Kids
Silk (Love Songs)
Total Hits Belgium
Total Hits France
Total Hits Germany
Total Hits Italy
Total Hits Netherlands
Total Hits Nordic
Total Hits Spain
Total Hits Sweden
Total Hits UK

International
Arabic
Bollywood Hits
Chansons
Classical India
Hindi Gold
Hollandse Hits
Hollandse Hits Gold
Karneval Germany
Nederpop
Nederpop Gold
Punjabi
Schlager
Schlager Sweden
Sounds of South India
South Africa Gospel
South Africa Modern
South Africa Traditional
Swiss Hits
Türk Müzigi
Volsmusik
World Carnival

Dance
Bass, Breaks & Beats
Chillout
Classic R'n'B & Soul
Disco Classics
Dance Floor Fillers
Groove (Disco & Funk)
Hip Hop

Rock
Classic Rock
Hard Rock
Harder Than Hell
Indie Classics
Rock Anthems
Rock of Ages

Country
Country

Urban
Urban

Classical
Classical Calm
Classical Greats
Classical Orchestral

Jazz
Cool Jazz
Jazz Classics

Others
Alternative
Alternative Classics
Blues
Kinderliedjes 6-11 (Netherlands)
(Cocktail) Lounge
New Age
Peuter & Kleuterliedjes (Netherlands)
Reggae
South African Traditional
South African Modern
Carnival

See also 
 Music Television

References

External links
 

Music television channels
M
Music organisations based in the Netherlands